Rattus is a genus of muroid rodents, all typically called rats. However, the term rat can also be applied to rodent species outside of this genus.

Species and description
The best-known Rattus species are the black rat (R. rattus) and the brown rat (R. norvegicus). The group is generally known as the Old World rats or true rats and originated in Asia.

Taxonomy of Rattus
The genus Rattus is a member of the giant subfamily Murinae. Several other murine genera are sometimes considered part of Rattus: Lenothrix, Anonymomys, Sundamys, Kadarsanomys, Diplothrix, Margaretamys, Lenomys, Komodomys, Palawanomys, Bunomys, Nesoromys, Stenomys, Taeromys, Paruromys, Abditomys, Tryphomys, Limnomys, Tarsomys, Bullimus, Apomys, Millardia, Srilankamys, Niviventer, Maxomys, Leopoldamys, Berylmys, Mastomys, Myomys, Praomys, Hylomyscus, Heimyscus, Stochomys, Dephomys and Aethomys.

The genus Rattus proper contains 64 extant species. A subgeneric breakdown of the species has been proposed, but does not include all species.

Species

Phylogeny
The following phylogeny of selected Rattus species is from Pagès, et al. (2010).

References

 
.
Rodent genera
Taxa named by Gotthelf Fischer von Waldheim
Extant Pleistocene first appearances